Prepare For Impact is the second studio album by Tom Green. It was released  through ViK. Recordings. It was produced by Mike Simpson of the Dust Brothers.

The Keepin' It Real Crew (Tom Green, "Playboy" Jeremy Klein, MC Shawn Anthony and Mike Simpson a.k.a. DJ EZ Mike) promoted this album release in June 2005 on the My Bum Is On Your Lips tour in Ontario, Canada.

Track listing
"Write Rhymes and Act Like An Asshole" – 3:47 
"My Bum Is On Ya Lips" – 3:21
"Mike Check" – 1:47
"I'm an Idiot" – 2:43
"Teachers Suck" – 3:59
"Science Is Everywhere" – 3:36
"People in My Neighborhood" – 4:23
"Goofy Rocking Chair" – 2:07
"My Name Is Hammy" – 2:55
"?" – 0:14
"I Like Hooters" – 3:49
"I'm No Comedian" – 2:45
"Don't Mess with a Man (After He Takes a Big Poo Poo)" – 3:38

Single
"Teachers Suck" (November 2005) (With different lyrics, this song was re-made for the Bob the Butler soundtrack, performed by Green, with the song being titled "My Name is Bob")

References

External links

www.tomgreen.com

Tom Green albums
2005 albums
ViK. Recordings albums
Albums produced by Michael Simpson (producer)